Dean Fullman (born 20 June 1978), best known by his stage name DJ Slimzee, is an English DJ who currently hosts a show on Rinse FM, returning from his previous show on NTS. He is best known for his show on pirate radio station Rinse FM in the early noughties and its influential role in the development of grime music.

Career
DJ Slimzee co-founded Rinse FM in 1994. For a three-year period in the early days of the station, the Rinse studio was hosted in DJ Slimzee's house. From the late 1990s, Slimzee was one of the first DJs to start introducing the dark new music coming out of the UK garage scene into his sets and throughout the early 2000s, he hosted a Sunday afternoon grime show which would regularly showcase some of the genre's best MCs. Many artists who featured on Slimzee's pirate radio shows went on to have mainstream success; he received a golden disc in recognition of his contribution to Dizzee Rascal's successful debut album, Boy in da Corner.

In 2005, Ofcom disconnected a Rinse FM radio transmitter; after admitting operating a pirate radio station and causing damage by erecting broadcast equipment, Slimzee received a three-year conditional discharge, but at Tower Hamlets council's request was also given an ASBO, believed to be the first of its kind, banning him from every rooftop in the borough of Tower Hamlets. This event ended Slimzee's regular show on Rinse FM, but he continued to host occasional one off shows and take live bookings until his return to regular radio on NTS in 2014. Since his return to radio, Slimzee has recorded sets with MCs including Skepta, Jammer, Scratchy, D Double E and Trim.

Discography

Mix albums
2002: Sidewinder Studio Mix (with Dizzee Rascal and Wiley)
2003: Street Beats (with Gods Gift)
2004: Bingo Beats

Live albums
2002: Sidewinder Live (recorded live on Rinse FM with Dizzee Rascal)

References

External links
Official Soundcloud: Slimzee

English radio presenters
Living people
1978 births
English DJs
People from Bow, London
Grime music artists
UK garage musicians